Apollo High School is a high school located at 1000 44th Ave N. in Saint Cloud, Minnesota, United States. Apollo is one of the St. Cloud Area School District's two public high schools, the other being Technical High School. In 2016, about a quarter of the students were of Somali descent.

Apollo High's boundary includes, in addition to sections of St. Cloud: St. Joseph, St. John's University,  Waite Park, sections of Sartell, and a very small portion of Rockville.

References

Public high schools in Minnesota
Buildings and structures in St. Cloud, Minnesota
Educational institutions established in 1970
Schools in Stearns County, Minnesota
1970 establishments in Minnesota